Spilomyia graciosa is a species of Hoverfly in the family Syrphidae.

Distribution
Iraq.

References

Eristalinae
Insects described in 1985
Diptera of Asia